Scaptesylodes incerta is a moth in the family Crambidae. It was first described by Georg Semper in 1899 and it is found on Mindanao in the Philippines.

References

Moths described in 1899
Spilomelinae